Mnesarchella hamadelpha is a species of primitive moth in the family Mnesarchaeidae. It is endemic to New Zealand and is found in the Wellington, Marlborough Sounds, Marlborough and Nelson regions. It is frequently found at altitudes of between 800 and 1400m but can be found as low as approximately 400 m. It is often found in damp moss covered but well lit native forest. This species is very similar in appearance to M. acuta. However although M. hamadelpha is present in the same locations as M. acuta, it is usually found at higher altitudes or at later times in the year . Adults are on the wing from November to February.

Taxonomy

This species was first described  by Edward Meyrick in 1888 and named Mnesarchaea hamadelpha. Alfred Philpott, thinking he was describing a new species, named this species Mnesarchaea similis in 1924. In 1928 George Hudson synonymised this name with Mnesarchaea hamadelpha. In 2019 George William Gibbs reviewed the species within the family Mnesarchaeidae. During this review he placed within the genus Mnesarchella. The male lectotype specimen was collected at Mount Arthur in January by Meyrick and is held at the Natural History Museum, London.

Description 

Meyrick described this species as follows:
This species is very similar in appearance to M. acuta and the two can be difficult to distinguish from one another. As a general statement M. Hamadelpha has a more white basal area on its forewings which tends to be differ from the usually more ochreous colour of the same area on M. acuta forewings. The two species can be more reliably distinguished through other differences. Although M. hamadelpha is present in the same locations as M. acuta, it is usually found at higher altitudes or at later times in the year than M. acuta.

Distribution 
This species is endemic to New Zealand. It is found in the Wellington, Marlborough Sounds, Marlborough and Nelson regions. It is frequently found at altitudes of between 800 and 1400m but can be found as low as approximately 400 m.

Habitat 
M. hamadelpha is often found in damp moss covered but well lit native forest.

Behaviour 
This species is on the wing from November to February.

References

Moths described in 1888
Endemic fauna of New Zealand
Moths of New Zealand
Mnesarchaeoidea
Taxa named by Edward Meyrick
Endemic moths of New Zealand